Alvin Eugene Bryant (September 30, 1930 – April 16, 2021) was a Canadian football player who played for the Edmonton Eskimos. He won the Grey Cup with the Eskimos in 1954.

References

1930 births
2021 deaths
Edmonton Elks players
Players of Canadian football from Alberta
Canadian football people from Edmonton